is Hatsune Okumura's first digital single. It was released on April 23, 2008, by Avex Trax.

Specifics
Artist: Okumura Hatsune
Title:  
Release Date: 2008.04.23
Price: ￥200

Track list

CD section
  (short version)

2008 singles
2008 songs